Siemens Canada Limited is the principal Canadian subsidiary of the multinational engineering and electronics company Siemens. It is active in many fields, ranging from oil and gas, petrochemicals, power generation and distribution to information and communications, and health care.

References 

Siemens
Conglomerate companies of Canada